The PLA Navy Platinum Jubilee Parade was a Chinese naval military parade which was held in the port city of Qingdao on 23 April 2019, in honor of the 70th anniversary (Platinum Jubilee) of the People's Liberation Army Navy (PLAN). It was the first naval parade by the PLAN since the 2018 South China Sea Parade just over year prior. Xi Jinping, General Secretary of the Chinese Communist Party and Chairman of the Central Military Commission reviewed the parade in his position as party leader and commander-in-chief. 32 naval vessels and 39 naval warplanes of the PLAN took part in the parade.

Parade participants
Besides PLAN officials and ships, the parade included 13 foreign ships and was attended by 60 foreign delegations. The following ships took part in the parade:

Chinese aircraft carrier Liaoning
Type 055 destroyer
Admiral Gorshkov-class frigate (Russia)
 (India)
 (India)
 (Singapore)
 (Australia)
 (Japan)
 (Philippines)
 (Bangladesh)
 F14 Sinphyushin (Myanmar)

Ships also came from countries such as France, Vietnam and Thailand.

References

2019 in China
Military parades in China
South China Sea Parade
Military history of the People's Republic of China
People's Liberation Army Navy